Synapticolidae is a family of cyclopoid copepods in the order Cyclopoida. There are about 11 genera and at least 50 described species in Synapticolidae. Characteristics of this family include the expression of body segments in both sexes, well-developed swimming legs, and a tapering mandible with toothed margins.

Genera
These 11 genera belong to the family Synapticolidae:
 Calypsarion H.o.Humes, 1969
 Calypsina Humes & Stock, 1972
 Calysion
 Caribulus Humes & Stock, 1972
 Chauliolobion Humes, 1975
 Lecanthurius
 Lecanurius Kossmann, 1877
 Lichothuria Stock, 1968
 Meomicola Stock, Humes & Gooding, 1963
 Scambicornus Heegaard, 1944
 Synapticola Voigt, 1892

References

Cyclopoida
Articles created by Qbugbot
Crustacean families